The Northeastern Huskies women's soccer team represents Northeastern University in NCAA Division I college soccer. The team belongs to the Colonial Athletic Association and plays home games at Parsons Field. The Huskies are currently led by second-year head coach Ashley Phillips. The team has an all-time record 183–185–46 (.498) through the 2016 season. The Huskies have made 4 appearances in the NCAA tournament with a combined record of 2–3, having made the tournament in 2008, 2013, 2014 and 2016.

Head coaches
Julia Claudio, 1996–98 (11–38–7 (.259))
Ed Matz, 1999–2009 (99–91–25 (.518))
Tracey Leone, 2010–2015 (59–49–14 (.541))
Ashley Phillips, 2016–present (14–7–1 (.659))

Record By Year
References:

References

External links
 

 

NCAA Division I women's soccer teams